Chuadanga, is a district of the western Khulna Division of Bangladesh. It is bordered by the Indian state of  West Bengal to the west, Meherpur District to the northwest, Jessore District to the south, Jhenaidah District to the east, and Kushtia District to the north. Before partition Chuadanga was one of the five subdivisions under Nadia district.

History
Chuadanga witnessed a number of uprisings during the British rule of India. The uprisings included Wahabi Movement (1831), Faraizi Movement(1838–47), Sepoy Rebellion (1857), Indigo Rebellion (1859–60), Khilafat Movement (1920), Swadeshi Movement (1906), Non-cooperation movement, Violation of Law and Salt Satyagraha (1920–40), and Quit India Movement or August Revolt (1942).

Under British rule, Chuadanga was a sub-division within Nadia District. During partition, in 1947, excepting Krishnaganj thana (still under Nadia in West Bengal), Chuadanga was incorporated into East Pakistan. History of Chuadanga can be found in Nadia District Gazetteer during British rule. During Bangladesh Liberation War of 1971 Chuadanga was declared as the first capital of Bangladesh on 10 April. Chuadanga was the location of more than 100 battles between the Pakistan Army and the pro-independence Mukti Bahini. There is a mass graveyard of the victims of the Bangladesh genocide during the Bangladesh Liberation war behind the Chuadanga Government Hospital.

Geography
Chuadanga district has an area of 1,157.42 km2. It shares domestic borders with the Kushtia District on the northeast, Meherpur on the northwest, and Jhenaidah on the south and southeast. On its southwest lies the Nadia District (in the state of West Bengal in India). In January 2018, the district had the lowest temperature in Bangladesh.

Administration
Until the Partition of India in 1947 Chuadanga sub-division was within Nadia district.

Deputy Commissioner (DC): Mohammad Aminul Islam Khan

Subdivisions
Chuadanga district is divided into  four Upazilas which run cities of the same name.
Chuadanga Sadar Upazila
Alamdanga Upazila
Jibannagar Upazila
Damurhuda Upazila

Demographics

According to the 2011 Bangladesh census, Chuadanga District had a population of 1,129,015, of which 564,819 were males and 564,196 females. Rural population was 822858 (72.88%) and urban population was 306157 (27.12%). Chuadanga had a literacy rate of 45.91% for the population 7 years and above: 46.88% for males and 44.93% for females.

Muslims formed 97.46% of the population, Hindus 2.35%, and others 0.19%.

The population of the district was 987,382 during the 2001 national survey with 50.82% male and female 49.18% compositions.

Economy
Most of this small district is dedicated to agriculture. Occupational distributions clearly show this with agriculture employing 68% of the labour force, while only 12% are involved in commerce. Total cultivable land amounts to 894.20 km2, of which 57% is under some sort of irrigation. Cotton is a cash crop grown in the district and in 2013, cotton was cultivated in 4149 hectares.

Besides agriculture the district is now experiencing industrial growth. Major industries include Zaman Group of Industries, Bangas bread and biscuit, Tallu Spinning mills Ltd, Khatun Plastic Limited, and Carew & Company Bangladesh Limited. Carew & Co (Bangladesh) Ltd (1933), which is situated at Darshana of Damurhuda Upazila of Chuadanga district. Sugar cane is cultivated in Darshana. Carew & Company has a distillery also which is the lone spirit producing plant of Bangladesh, Carew & Company Bangladesh Limited is an enterprise of Bangladesh Sugar & Food Industries Corporation (BSFIC). BSFIC is an autonomous body of Ministry of Industries.

Transportation
Chuadanga is connected to four of its neighbouring districts (Kushtia, Jessore, Jhenidah and Meherpur) through inter-district highways and connected to Jessore, Jhenaidah and Kushtia by railway. The district is connected to the rest of the country by five highways and a railway. There are 203 km of finished road, 211 km herring-bone and 132 km mud road. A total length of railway tracks of just over 50 km connects the three railway stations inside the district with the country's railway network. By 2013, five out of the ten stations in the district were shut down due to a lack of manpower.

See also
 Districts of Bangladesh

Notes

References

External links
 

 
Districts of Bangladesh
Khulna Division